Udea hamalis is a species of moth in the family Crambidae described by Carl Peter Thunberg in 1788. It is found from Fennoscandia south to Switzerland and Ukraine and from France east to Russia.

The wingspan is 16–21 mm.

The larvae feed on Vaccinium, Oxalis and Anemone species.

References

Moths described in 1788
hamalis
Moths of Europe